Pallanzeno is a comune (municipality) in the Province of Verbano-Cusio-Ossola in the Italian region Piedmont, located about  northeast of Turin and about  northwest of Verbania.

Pallanzeno borders the following municipalities: Beura-Cardezza, Borgomezzavalle, Calasca-Castiglione, Piedimulera, Villadossola, Vogogna.

References

Cities and towns in Piedmont